The American Hockey Association (AHA) was a semi-professional ice hockey league that operated for the 1992-93 season. The league operated independently, and was not affiliated with any higher league. The league operated with central ownership of teams, presided over by Charlie Hodgins. The league scheduled exhibition games with the Russian Red Army team, and also played against them in the all-star game. The league suspended operations on January 29, 1993, resulting in no champion being declared.

Teams
Five teams participated in the league.

Final standings
Final standings as of January 29, 1993.

References

Defunct ice hockey leagues in the United States
1992–93 in American ice hockey by league